Gad Tedeschi (Hebrew: גד טדסקי; Italian: Guido Tedeschi) (born 1907; died 1992) was an Israeli jurist.

Early life 
Tedeschi was born in the town of Rovigo in north-eastern Italy in 1907. He emigrated to the British Mandate of Palestine in 1939, entering the country initially with a tourist visa.

Awards 
 In 1954, Tedeschi was awarded the Israel Prize, for jurisprudence.

References

See also 
List of Israel Prize recipients
Tedeschi

Italian emigrants to Mandatory Palestine
20th-century Italian Jews
Israeli legal scholars
Israel Prize in law recipients
Academic staff of the University of Siena
Academic staff of the Hebrew University of Jerusalem
Members of the Israel Academy of Sciences and Humanities
People from Rovigo
People of Venetian descent
1907 births
1992 deaths